Club Universitario de La Paz is a professional football team based in La Paz Department, Bolivia that competes in the Bolivian Primera División.

Honours

National
Bolivian Primera División
Winners (1): 1969

References

Association football clubs established in 1922
Football clubs in Bolivia
1922 establishments in Bolivia